Stéphane Hillel (born 1955) is a French stage, film and television actor.

Selected filmography
 À nous les petites Anglaises (1976)
 Arrête ton char... bidasse! (1977)
 The Wonderful Day (1980)

References

Bibliography
 Jean-François Prévand. Camus, Sartre... et "Les Autres. Editions Lansman, 1996.

External links

1955 births
Living people
French male film actors
French male television actors